François Letourneau (born 27 May 27, 1969 in Saint-Jérôme, Quebec) is a Canadian slalom canoeist who competed from the late 1980s to the mid-2000s. He finished eighth in the C2 event at the 1996 Summer Olympics in Atlanta.

His partner in the C2 boat throughout his career was Benoît Gauthier.

World Cup individual podiums

1 Pan American Championship counting for World Cup points

References

1969 births
Canadian male canoeists
Canoeists at the 1996 Summer Olympics
Living people
Olympic canoeists of Canada
Sportspeople from Quebec
People from Saint-Jérôme